The Alejandro Hernández Show (sometimes shortened to TAHS) is a web series broadcast on YouTube, which tells the reality of the Facebook generation and reflects Venezuelan customs. It was created in 2009 by Alejandro Hernández who also writes, directs and edits the episodes himself.

It is the first web series to become successful in Venezuela. His first episode, "Cita de salir + el @", which talks about Facebook's "favorite quotations" and the use of the At sign, occurred to Hernández while he was browsing his Facebook profile and noticed they were used in wrong ways, which motivated him to create his show. Hernández said that the idea started because he wanted to "vent to the world" and the episodic content mainly included criticism about recurring grammatical mistakes, but it became a more elaborated program in the future. The appeal of the show is in the way it mixes local customs with pop culture and technology. Hernández believes that show's success relies on his ability to make people identify with the things he says. He stated that he enjoys giving his show "a touch of Hollywood". He added "in my country, people aren’t used to this type of production because most Venezuelan movies have a soap opera look, but thanks to the digital revolution, this is starting to change.

His 18th episode, "Voz orgasmicangelical, profesores necios y la chama que no se calla la jeta", has been the most viewed to date, surpassing the million mark. The show was spoofed by Venezuelan comedian Luis Chataing in his program "Sí Luis".

Plot

Storyline and themes
The show presents a series of sketches that usually narrate the everyday life of the Venezuelan citizen, especially from a juvenile point of view, targeting the Web 2.0 generation. The scripts reference, for the most part, popular phrases told by Venezuelan mothers, users behavior in social networks, movie trailer spoofs and generally a great amount of social satire.

Recurring elements
The excessive use of jump cuts and transitions is always present and it became the trademark of the show. It also includes sound effects of drum and trumpet hits in cut-to-black transitions, popularized by science fiction television series such as Lost and Fringe, both created by J. J. Abrams. In several interviews, Hernández has stated that Abrams is one of his main influences and he even paid tribute to the title sequence of Lost in episode 11.

Production 
The series is not financed by a company and it is produced entirely by Hernández.
Contrary to popular belief, the background with the show's logo that appears on most of the episodes is not digitally generated with the use of a green screen. Instead, a large LCD TV is used displaying the logo image in full screen. Hernández has stated several times that he uses Adobe Premiere Pro for non-linear editing, and Adobe After Effects for the colorization process and motion graphics. He uses his own 3x3 room where he recreates a filming set. The equipment used to shoot the series is a Canon EOS 550D DSLR camera.

PlanetaUrbe TV and El Mostacho transition 
After the first episodes were uploaded to YouTube, Hernández signed a contract providing exclusive rights to PlanetaUrbe TV, where he was required to upload all of his content to PlanetaUrbe's video platform. However, several users could illegally extract the videos and they were eventually uploaded to YouTube, although with lower quality. From that point, episodes with shorter length categorized as Special Features started to air. They focused on a single subject and their numeric classification ended with ".5", depending on the episode that preceded. After the contract ended, the show came back to its traditional format and new episodes were uploaded to El Mostacho's YouTube channel, where it stayed for three months until episode 29 was released on June 17, 2012. Since then, there hasn't been any official announcements of new episodes, so the show's destiny remains unclear.

Episodes 
The series consists of total of 29 episodes to date over one unique season, with episode 1 being released on September 12, 2009. The first six episodes were uploaded to Hernández's official Facebook page. It wasn't until episode 7 that they started airing on YouTube.

Critical reception 
The Alejandro Hernández Show received mostly favorable reviews by the online community and by both Venezuelan and international press. In an article by Venezuelan renowned newspaper Diario Panorama, the show received a positive review, stating that Hernández became «one of the most influential Venezuelan figures in the 2.0 world». InfoSur Hoy, news source from Latin America and the Caribbean, considered Hernández as «the voice of Venezuelan youth» and also added that the show became «one of the most popular and talked-about programs in Venezuela». However, La Hojilla, a notable opinion program that airs on the government's official TV channel Venezolana de Televisión, loathed the content of the show, qualifying it as «stupid» and «a bad influence to Venezuelan youth». Mario Silva, the program's host, despite admitting that the series has «good editing and production», labeled Hernández as «dangerous», and someone to be careful about. Venezuelan host and comedian Luis Chataing mentioned Hernández in his Televen's talk show Chataing TV where he said that Hernández «is a maracucho that does an excellent work».

When the show transitioned to PlanetaUrbe TV and El Mostacho, fan reaction was mostly unfavorable. They considered that the show was sacrificing quality content over revenue. In response to the criticism and appearance of product placement, a parody to the show's own audience was made in episode 25 (the last one broadcast on PlanetaUrbe TV) where Hernández mocks some of the criticism he was getting by including quotes such as «Alejandro, you're a sell-out!», affirmations to which Hernández responded with «Don't I have the right to make money? God dammit!».

References

External links 
 
 Official YouTube Channel
 Official Twitter
 Official Facebook

2000s YouTube series
2009 web series debuts
2010s YouTube series
Comedy web series